Antwaun Carter (born September 9, 1981) is a former American football running back.

High school

Carter played at South Aiken High School, where, in addition to football, was a track star, winning the state 100-meter title in 2001. The same year he won the state title in the shot put.  The football team had lost 29 consecutive games going into his senior season, which Carter finished with 1,856 yards, before finally breaking a 42–14 win against Midland Valley High School behind Carter's 200-plus rushing yards

College career
After limited scholarship offers coming out of high school, he enrolled at Sacramento City College, eventually drawing attention from Boise State University head coach Dan Hawkins, and transferred to join Boise State's 'tailback by committee' approach as a short yardage and goal line back.

Carter's playing career at Boise State University began his junior season of 2004, posting 278 yards on 75 rushes and 7 touchdowns.  He returned his senior season to record 100 rushes for 440 yards and 10 touchdowns.  His only catch came in 2004 for a 9-yard gain.

According to one interview, Carter entered into his senior season believing he'd be seeing time primarily as the goal line back, but as the season continued, he was involved in heavy rotation with the other backs. He finished with 10 touchdowns on 100 carries for 840 yards.

Professional career

Drafted in 20th round of the NFL Europa Free Agent Draft in 2007 by the Cologne Centurions, where he finished the season with 2 rushes for 6 yards and 2 catches for 9 yards.
He had finished training camp as the starting tailback, having beat out eventual NFLE MVP Derrick Ross and AJ Harris, but suffered a knee injury early in the first regular season game.

Carter was selected in the 4th round, 43rd overall, by Team Alabama in the inaugural All American Football League Draft. After the league suspended operations he was invited the Kansas City Chiefs camp in May 2008 where he made the practice squad. He was released in 2010.

References

External links
 http://sports.espn.go.com/ncf/player/profile?playerId=150198

Players of American football from South Carolina
1981 births
Living people
American football running backs
Cologne Centurions (NFL Europe) players
Sacramento City Panthers football players
Boise State Broncos football players
Sportspeople from Aiken, South Carolina